This is a list of notable people who were born in or near, or have been residents of the Basingstoke, Hampshire, England.

Bold text denotes a person who was born in Basingstoke.

Arts and humanities
 Jane Austen,  author (born and wrote many of her major works in nearby Steventon)
 Grace Blakeley,  economics and political journalist and commentator
 Lucy Coats,  author
 John Gardner,  spy novelist
 Macdonald Hastings,  journalist and war correspondent
 E O Higgins,  author
 John James,  architect
 Waldemar Januszczak,  art critic and filmmaker
 Sima Kotecha,  journalist
 Robert Steadman,  composer and conductor
 Julian Stockwin,  author
 Alex Thomson,  presenter and chief correspondent for Channel 4 News
 Joseph Warton,  academic, literary critic and poet
 Thomas Warton,  academic and poet, Poet Laureate 1785–1790
 Chuck Whelon,  creator, artist and co-writer of the Pewfell comic strip

Entertainment
 John Arlott, cricket journalist, writer and commentator
 Sam Attwater, actor
 Carl Barât, lead singer and guitarist with The Libertines and Dirty Pretty Things
 Christian Brassington, actor
 Shelley Conn, actress
 Mark Griffin, actor, played Action Man in the Action Man films and Trojan in the TV series Gladiators
 Max Harwood, actor
 Elizabeth Hurley, actress and model
 Steve Lamacq, DJ
 Ian McNeice, actor
 Tara Palmer-Tomkinson, socialite, "it girl", television presenter, model and charity patron
 Pete Staples, bassist for the 1960s supergroup The Troggs
 Sarah Sutton, actress and former Doctor Who companion
 Ramon Tikaram, actor
 Tanita Tikaram, singer-songwriter
 Gabriella Wilde, actress 
 Christine Williams, former Playboy centerfold

Sport
 Joel Bagan, professional footballer for Cardiff City
 Sal Bibbo, former professional footballer for Reading
 Alex Bogdanovic, tennis player
 Sid Castle, former professional footballer for Tottenham Hotspur, Charlton Athletic and Chelsea, and former manager of Ajax
 Tom Cleverley, professional footballer for Watford
 Georgina Corrick, professional softball player
 Tom Croft, flanker/second row for the England national rugby union team and Leicester Tigers
 Matt Crossley, former professional footballer for Wycombe Wanderers
 Harlee Dean, professional footballer for Birmingham City
 Sean Doherty, former professional footballer for clubs including Blackpool and Port Vale
 Darren Flint, Hampshire cricketer
 Dean Francis, professional boxer
 Leanne Ganney, ice hockey player and captain of the Great Britain women's national ice hockey team
 Joshua Goodall, tennis player
 Paul Hogan, darts player
 Dave Holby, endurance athlete, holder of nine world indoor rowing records
 Aaron Jarvis, professional footballer for Scunthorpe United F.C.
 Liam Kelly, professional footballer for Feyenoord, currently on loan at Oxford United F.C.
 Mark Kelly, former professional footballer for Portsmouth and Republic of Ireland
 Olly Lancashire, professional footballer for Swindon Town
 Joe McDonnell, professional footballer for Eastleigh F.C.
 Mike McMeeken English rugby league footballer
 Lee Nurse, former Berkshire cricketer
 Josh Payne, professional footballer for Ebbsfleet United F.C.
 Tom Rees, English rugby union footballer for England and the London Wasps
 Justin Rose, golfer who grew up in the area
 Lee Sandford, former professional footballer for clubs including Portsmouth, Stoke City and Sheffield United
 Will Smallbone, professional footballer for Southampton F.C.
 Kathy Smallwood-Cook, bronze medal-winning Olympic sprinter
 Dominic Solanke, professional footballer for AFC Bournemouth
 Mitchell Stokes, Hampshire cricketer
 Kit Symons, football coach and former player
 Robert Tobin, athlete and sprinter
 Shaun Udal, former England test cricketer
 Rowan Vine, former professional footballer for clubs including Portsmouth, Birmingham City and Queens Park Rangers
 Jock Wallace Jr., former professional footballer and manager who spent the last part of his life living in the town
 Thomas White, Sussex cricketer

Other
 Arron Fraser Andrew Banks, British businessman and political donor
 Hubert Broad, test pilot for the de Havilland and Hawker aircraft companies
 Laurie Brown, former Bishop of Birmingham
 Thomas Burberry, founder of the Burberry clothing empire
 Charls Butler, writer, grammarian, theologist, naturalist, musical theorist
 Ruth Ellis, last woman to be hanged in Great Britain
 Joseph Storrs Fry, founder of Fry's chocolate company
 George Cecil Jones, chemist and occultist
 Hilary Jones, celebrity doctor
 Sir James Lancaster, 16th-century navigator and statesman
 John Aidan Liddell, VC, MC, First World War pilot
 Walter de Merton, Bishop of Rochester and founder of Merton College, Oxford
 William Paulet, 1st Marquess of Winchester, Statesman
 David Pawson, Baptist minister, Bible teacher and author
 William Sandys, 1st Baron Sandys of the Vyne, Tudor diplomat and Lord Chamberlain
 Sarah, Duchess of York and former wife of The Duke of York, raised in nearby Dummer
 L.E. Timberlake, Los Angeles City Council member, 1949–69
 Arthur Wellesley, 1st Duke of Wellington, and his successors (from 1817).

References

Basingstoke (famous residents)
 
People from Basingstoke